Hanamanahalli is a village in Dharwad district of Karnataka, India.

Demographics 
As of the 2011 Census of India there were 108 households in Hanamanahalli and a total population of 468 consisting of 239 males and 229 females. There were 63 children ages 0-6.

References

Villages in Dharwad district